Vadul Turcului (Romanian; ; , Vadul-Turkului) is a commune in Transnistria, Moldova. Its name means "Turk's ford" in Romanian. It is composed of two villages, Molochișul Mic (Малий Молокіш, Малый Молокиш) and Vadul Turcului.

It is also the site of the Church of the Blessed Virgin's Birth, a Russian Orthodox church featured on gold and silver coins issued in the series of Orthodox Temples (Transnistria) by Transnistria's Central Bank.

References

Communes of Transnistria
Bratslav Voivodeship
Baltsky Uyezd
Rîbnița District